Rainbow: A Private Affair is an Italian drama film directed by Paolo and Vittorio Taviani, based on the novel by Beppe Fenoglio. It is the last film directed by both brothers before Vittorio Taviani's death in 2018.

Plot
During the fighting of the liberation war in the Langhe, the partisan Milton is divided between the fights against the Nazi-fascists, the friendship for the brigade companions and his clandestine love for Fulvia.

Cast
 Luca Marinelli as Milton
 Valentina Bellè as Fulvia
 Giulio Beranek as Ivan
 Lorenzo Richelmy as Giorgio

Distribution
The film was shown in the Masters section of the 2017 Toronto International Film Festival on 8 September 2017 and it was released in Italy on 1 November 2017.

Awards and nominations

Italian Golden Globes Awards (2018)
 Best Actor (Luca Marinelli) (ex-aequo with Toni Servillo for The Girl in the Fog)
 Nominated for Best Cinematography (Simone Zampagni)

Nastro d'Argento Awards (2018)
 Special Nastro d'Argento Award to Paolo Taviani and Tributary Award to Vittorio Taviani

References

External links

2017 films
2017 drama films
Italian drama films
2010s Italian-language films
Films set in the 1940s